The CANT 11 was a single-engine biplane seaplane built by the Italian shipyard Cantiere Navale Triestino (CNT) in the early 1920s. It was intended for participation in the 1924 Schneider Cup.

References

011
Floatplanes
Schneider Trophy